Tsvetanka Krasteva (born 18 August 1935) is a Bulgarian athlete. She competed in the women's shot put at the 1960 Summer Olympics.

References

1935 births
Living people
Athletes (track and field) at the 1960 Summer Olympics
Bulgarian female shot putters
Olympic athletes of Bulgaria
Place of birth missing (living people)